601 California Street is a 22-story,  skyscraper in the financial district of San Francisco, California. The distinctly international style tower features eight corner offices per floor, and a terrace around the penthouse office, and received an Honor Award from the American Institute of Architects in 1963.

See also

 San Francisco's tallest buildings

References

External links
 601 California at The CAC Group

Anshen and Allen buildings
Financial District, San Francisco
International style architecture in California
Office buildings completed in 1961
Skyscraper office buildings in San Francisco